Bonne Glacier is a steep glacier  west-southwest of Hobbs Peak, descending northwest from Hobbs Ridge into Blue Glacier, in Victoria Land. The name is one of a group in the area associated with surveying applied in 1993 by the New Zealand Geographic Board. It was named after the Bonne map projection, a derivative conical projection, in which the parallels are spaced at true distances along meridians which are plotted as curves.

References 

Glaciers of Scott Coast